The 2018–19 Towson Tigers women's basketball team represented Towson University during the 2018–19 NCAA Division I women's basketball season. The Tigers, led by second year head coach Diane Richardson, played their home games at SECU Arena and were members of the Colonial Athletic Association (CAA). They finished the season 20–13, 11–7 CAA play to finish in a 3 way tie for third place. Towson won the CAA tournament championship game over Drexel, 53–49 to send Towson to their first ever NCAA tournament. They lost in the first round of the NCAA women's tournament to Connecticut.

Roster

Schedule

|-
!colspan=9 style=| Non-conference regular season

|-
!colspan=9 style=| CAA regular season

|-
!colspan=9 style=| CAA Women's Tournament

|-
!colspan=9 style=| NCAA Women's Tournament

See also
2018–19 Towson Tigers men's basketball team

References

Towson Tigers women's basketball seasons
Towson
Towson